{{Infobox military unit
| unit_name = Combat Logistics Battalion 5
| image = clb 5 logo.png
| dates = 21 August 2007 – present
| country = United States
| allegiance = United States of America
| branch = United States Marine Corps
| type = Logistics
| role = 
| size = 
| command_structure = Combat Logistics Regiment 11st Marine Logistics Group
| current_commander = LtCol Shawn A. Meier
| garrison = Marine Corps Base Camp Pendleton
| ceremonial_chief = 
| colonel_of_the_regiment = 
| nickname = Traveller
| patron = 
| motto = "We Bring It to the Fight"
| colors = 
| march = 
| mascot = 
| battles = Operation Iraqi FreedomOperation Enduring Freedom| anniversaries = 
}}Combat Logistics Battalion 5' (CLB-5) is a logistics battalion of the United States Marine Corps. CLB-5 is a subordinate battalion to Combat Logistics Regiment 1 and the 1st Marine Logistics Group. The unit is based out of the Marine Corps Base Camp Pendleton, California. The battalion nickname is "Traveller", named after the 16-hand grey American Saddlebred horse ridden into battle by General Robert E. Lee during the American Civil War.  The unit slogan is "Success Is Not An Accident."

Mission
Provide direct support tactical logistics to the 5th Marine Regiment beyond its organic capabilities in the areas of transportation, intermediate level supply, field level maintenance, and general engineering.

Subordinate units
 Headquarters & Service Company
 Combat Logistics Company Alpha
 Combat Logistics Company Bravo
 General Support Company

History
Combat Logistics Battalion 5 was activated on 25 May 2006 at Camp Pendleton, California and assigned as a subordinate battalion to Combat Logistics Regiment 1.

Participated in Operation Iraqi Freedom (OIF), Iraq from September 2006 to March 2007 and again in August 2008 to February 2009.
Participated in Operation Enduring Freedom (OEF), Afghanistan from March to October 2010 and again from March to August 2012.
Provided task organized logistics detachments in support of Special Purpose Marine Air-Ground Task Force (SPMAGTF) Crisis Response - CENTRAL COMMAND from 2015–2017.
Participated in Marine Rotational Force-Darwin (MRF-D) 20.2 in Darwin, Australia from March to October 2020 as the Logistics Command Element (LCE).

Unit Awards
A unit citation or commendation is an award bestowed upon an organization for the action cited. Members of the unit who participated in said actions are allowed to wear on their uniforms the awarded unit citation.  CLB-5 has been presented with the following awards [1]:

  Navy Unit Commendation Streamer with two Bronze Stars
Iraq – 2006 – 2007, 2008 - 2009
Afghanistan - 2010
  National Defense Service Streamer
2006 - current
 Iraq Campaign Streamer with three Bronze Stars
National Resolution 2006 - 2007
Iraqi Surge 2007 - 2008
Iraqi Sovereignty - 2009
 Afghanistan Campaign Streamer with two Bronze Stars
Consolidation III - 2010
Transition I - 2012
 Global War on Terrorism Service Streamer
2006 - current

Previous Commanders
LtCol M.E. Travis
LtCol Joe L. Jarosz
LtCol Robert T. Meade
LtCol Brian W. Ecarius
LtCol Sam K. Lee
LtCol Matthew T. James
LtCol John F. Soto Jr.

Previous Sergeants Major
Sergeant Major Willie T. Ward III
Sergeant Major Brian E. Cullins
Sergeant Major Troy E. Black (19th Sergeant Major of the Marine Corps)
Sergeant Major Joseph S. Gregory
Sergeant Major Keith D. Hoge
Sergeant Major James L. Horr
Sergeant Major Damian L. Reed
Sergeant Major David C. Hernandez (Current)

See also

 List of United States Marine Corps battalions
 Organization of the United States Marine Corps

References

Combat Logistics Battalion 5 (PDF) www.usmcu.edu.'' United States Marine Corps. September 18, 2017. Retrieved December 15, 2020.

External links
 CLB-5's Official Website
 :

CLB5